Sekolah Menengah Kebangsaan Kota Kemuning (shortened as SMK Kota Kemuning or SMKKK ), is a public secondary school which is located in Kota Kemuning, Shah Alam, Selangor, Malaysia.  As of 2020, this school holds more than 3000 students from around Kota Kemuning, Bukit Rimau, west of Jalan Kebun area, Alam Impian and even Taman Sentosa, Klang.

History
Sekolah Menengah Kebangsaan Kota Kemuning (previously known as Sekolah Menengah Kebangsaan Bukit Kemuning) started their school session on 7 January 2002.

The construction of the school is managed by the property development company HICOM-Gamuda Development Sdn. Bhd. (joint venture between DRB-HICOM and Gamuda Land) and on 15 November 2001, the ownership of the school was then handed over to Klang District Education Department of the Selangor Education Department which is under the governance of the Ministry of Education to be officialise as a school.

By 18 January 2002, the school only served students in the morning session as well as having 168 students and 16 teachers excluding the first principal of the school Tuan Haji Mohammed Nashan bin Singgan. The school till today remains under the Klang District Education Department even though geographically located under the jurisdiction of the Shah Alam City Council. The initial plan of the infrastructure is to cater 1500 students into 44 classrooms.

Construction of new school
SMK Kota Kemuning has been one of the best schools in the Township of Kota Kemuning, this results in the over 3000 students that are attending this school. This has inevitably brought up the issue of overcrowding.

This issue was addressed by constructing an awning, adding more classes and et cetera. Although all this initiatives have been taken, this issue still remains a challenge, so former Education Minister Datuk Seri Mahdzir Khalid said the project was first announced in 2013 under a Public Private Partnership (PPP) programme to accommodate the growing number of students in the township through the construction of SMK Kota Kemuning 2.

See also

List of schools in Selangor
Lists of schools in Malaysia
Education in Malaysia

Gallery

References

External links
 

Schools in Selangor
Secondary schools in Malaysia